txt2tags is a document generator software that uses a lightweight markup language. txt2tags is free software under GNU General Public License.

Written in Python, it can export documents to several formats including: HTML, XHTML, SGML, LaTeX, Lout, roff, MediaWiki, Google Code Wiki, DokuWiki, MoinMoin, MagicPoint, PageMaker and plain text.

Syntax examples
**bold text**
//italic text//
``monospace text``
__underlined__
--strike-through--
= Level 1 Header =
== Level 2 Header ==
=== Level 3 Header ===
[Link text www.example.com]

See also

 Comparison of documentation generators
 Comparison of document markup languages

References

External links
 

Computer-related introductions in 2001
Free software programmed in Python
Lightweight markup languages